Oedosphenella is a genus of tephritid  or fruit flies in the family Tephritidae.

Species
Oedosphenella auriella (Munro, 1939)
Oedosphenella canariensis (Macquart, 1839)

References

Tephritinae
Tephritidae genera
Diptera of Africa